We'll Never Turn Back is the seventh studio album by American gospel and soul singer Mavis Staples, released April 24, 2007 on ANTI- Records. Recorded in 2007 and produced by roots rock and blues musician Ry Cooder, it is a concept album with lyrical themes relating to the Civil Rights Movement of the 1950s and 1960s. Upon its release, We'll Never Turn Back received positive reviews from most music critics. It was also named one of the best albums of 2007 by several music writers and publications.

Reception

Critical response
We'll Never Turn Back received positive reviews from most music critics. At Metacritic, which assigns a normalized rating out of 100 to reviews from mainstream critics, the album received an average score of 76, based on 14 reviews, which indicates "generally favorable reviews". Allmusic writer Thom Jurek gave it three-and-a-half out of five stars and commended Staples for her vocal ability and performance, while calling it "the kind of album we need at the moment, one that doesn't flinch from the tradition but doesn't present it as a museum piece either". The Boston Globes Renée Graham praised Staples's singing and additional songwriting on the album, stating "Mavis Staples doesn't so much sing a song as baptize it in truth". Caroline Sullivan of The Guardian praised her performance, stating "Staples is magnificent… Her voice is in tatters by the closing 'Jesus Is On the Mainline', and the memory lingers long after those ragged final notes". Entertainment Weeklys Will Hermes gave We'll Never Turn Back a B+ rating and described Staples's voice as "rich, weathered, and full of fire". Evening Standard writer Pete Clark gave it four out of four stars and praised Ry Cooder's production.

Jon Pareles of The New York Times called the album "bluesy, unvarnished, gutsy and knowing", and he described its music as "righteous, not self-righteous, and never far from roots in the Mississippi mud". However, PopMatters writer Lester Feder expressed that its "musical sophistication" can overshadow Staples's lyrics, stating "the album’s sound is so easy on the ears that it is extremely tempting to let it drown out the challenging sentiments of her words". In his consumer guide for MSN Music, music critic Robert Christgau gave We'll Never Turn Back an A− rating, indicating "the kind of garden-variety good record that is the great luxury of musical micromarketing and overproduction. Anyone open to its aesthetic will enjoy more than half its tracks". Christgau praised Staples's performance and wrote "she doesn't merely revive rousing old songs--she brings their moral passion into the present". Both USA Today and the Chicago Sun-Times gave it ratings of three-and-a-half out of four stars. Jim DeRogatis of the latter publication wrote that Staples "infuses the material with a passion and urgency undiminished by the passing of time", and he discussed the relevance of the album's themes to current events, stating:

The Washington Posts Bill Friskics-Warren shared a similar sentiment in his review, writing "Staples reinvests… with the moral authority to speak to social and economic injustices that persist today" and "rarely have 'remakes' sounded so tonic or inspired". The album received an A rating from the Boston Herald, which wrote "In the course of celebrating a landmark, Staples and Cooder make one of their own". We'll Never Turn Back also received perfect ratings from The Independent and NOW magazine. LA Weeklys Ernest Hardy gave it a rave review and lauded the album's sound, writing "Powerfully raw, suggestive blues is the foundation of the CD, but that root allows the collaborators to sprawl through other genres, reminding you of the connections between them all — blues and gospel, spirituals and jazz".

Accolades
We'll Never Turn Back was named one of the best albums of 2007 by several music writers and publications, including PopMatters (number 11) and The Austin Chronicle (number five). The album was ranked number 48 on Rolling Stone magazine's list of the Top 50 Albums of 2007. Los Angeles Times columnist Todd Martens named We'll Never Turn Back the second best album of the year, and Greg Kot of the Chicago Tribune ranked it number one on his list of the best albums of 2007.

Track listing
 All songs were produced by Ry Cooder.

Personnel
Credits for We'll Never Turn Back adapted from liner notes.

 Aisha Ayers – production assistant
 David Bartlett – photography
 Joachim Cooder – percussion, arranger, producer
 Ry Cooder – guitar, mandolin, arranger, producer
 Mike Elizondo – bass, piano
 Betty Fikes – background vocals
 Bernie Grundman – mastering
 Rutha Harris – background vocals
 Andy Kaulkin – executive producer

 Jim Keltner – drums
 Ladysmith Black Mambazo - background vocals
 Rep. John Lewis – liner notes
 Pete Martinez – assistant
 Charles Neblett – background vocals
 Martin Pradler – engineer, mixing
 Joshua Douglas Smith – assistant
 Mavis Staples – arranger, vocals, author
 Chris Strong – portraits
 Susan Titelman – session photographer

Chart history

See also

 Civil rights movement in popular culture

References

External links
 We'll Never Turn Back at Metacritic
 We'll Never Turn Back at ANTI- website
 We'll Never Turn Back at AllMusic website

Mavis Staples albums
2007 albums
albums produced by Ry Cooder
Concept albums
Anti- (record label) albums
Albums recorded at Sound City Studios